The 2012 ITF Women's Circuit – Suzhou was a professional tennis tournament played on hard courts. It was the first edition of the tournament which was part of the 2012 ITF Women's Circuit. It took place in Suzhou, China, on 8–14 October 2012.

WTA entrants

Seeds 

 1 Rankings as of 1 October 2012

Other entrants 
The following players received wildcards into the singles main draw:
  Tian Ran
  Wang Yafan
  Yang Zhaoxuan
  Zhu Lin

The following players received entry from the qualifying draw:
  Guo Lu
  Liang Chen
  Yang Zi
  Zhang Yuxuan

Champions

Singles 

  Hsieh Su-wei def.  Duan Yingying 6–2, 6–2

Doubles 

  Timea Bacsinszky /  Caroline Garcia def.  Yang Zhaoxuan /  Zhao Yijing 7–5, 6–3

External links 
 2012 ITF Women's Circuit – Suzhou at ITFTennis.com

Suzhou
2012
2012 in Chinese tennis